KDQN-FM (92.1 FM) is a radio station broadcasting a country music format. Licensed to De Queen, Arkansas, United States, the station serves the Texarkana area.  The station is currently owned by Jay W. Bunyard & Teresa Bunyard, through licensee Bunyard Broadcasting, Inc.

References

External links
 

Country radio stations in the United States
DQN-FM
Radio stations established in 1975